Columbus is the second largest city and county seat of Cherokee County, Kansas, United States.  As of the 2020 census, the population of the city was 2,929.  It is located approximately 15 miles south-southwest of Pittsburg.

History
The first settlement was made at Columbus in 1868. The first post office in Columbus was established in 1869.

Columbus was a railroad junction for the Saint Louis and San Francisco, and the Missouri, Kansas, and Texas railroads. It was named Columbus by A.L. Peters, one of the European-American founders, for his hometown of Columbus, Ohio; the name thus indirectly honors Christopher Columbus, the explorer. Coal, lead and zinc were mined in the region. Columbus had a considerable trade in agricultural products, and its businesses included machine shops, grain elevators, flour mills, a cigar factory, bottle works (soft drinks), a canning factory, and an extensive brick-making plant.

In 1875, Robert A. Long and Victor Bell formed the Long-Bell Lumber Company in Columbus. From one lumberyard, Long-Bell expanded operations and holdings to become one of the largest vertically integrated lumber companies in the United States.  In 1956 it was purchased by International Paper.

Geography
Columbus is located at  (37.171379, -94.840704).

Climate
The climate in this area is characterized by hot, humid summers and generally mild to cool winters.  According to the Köppen Climate Classification system, Columbus has a humid subtropical climate, abbreviated "Cfa" on climate maps.

Demographics

2010 census
As of the census of 2010, there were 3,312 people, 1,424 households, and 850 families living in the city. The racial makeup of the city was 92.9% White, 0.5% African American, 2.7% Native American, 0.3% Asian, 0.4% from other races, and 3.3% from two or more races. Hispanic or Latino of any race were 2.1% of the population.

There were 1,424 households, of which 30.3% had children under the age of 18 living with them, 42.1% were married couples living together, 13.6% had a female householder with no husband present, 4.1% had a male householder with no wife present, and 40.3% were non-families. 34.9% of all households were made up of individuals, and 19.3% had someone living alone who was 65 years of age or older. The average household size was 2.29 and the average family size was 2.94.

The median age in the city was 39.1 years. 25% of residents were under the age of 18; 8.9% were between the ages of 18 and 24; 22.6% were from 25 to 44; 23.8% were from 45 to 64; and 19.7% were 65 years of age or older. The gender makeup of the city was 46.4% male and 53.6% female.

2000 census
As of the census of 2000, there were 3,396 people, 1,412 households, and 885 families living in the city. The racial makeup of the city was 94.70% White, 0.32% African American, 1.56% Native American, 0.41% Asian, 0.77% from other races, and 2.24% from two or more races. Hispanic or Latino of any race were 2.03% of the population.

There were 1,412 households, out of which 29.7% had children under the age of 18 living with them, 47.5% were married couples living together, 11.3% had a female householder with no husband present, and 37.3% were non-families. 34.5% of all households were made up of individuals, and 18.7% had someone living alone who was 65 years of age or older. The average household size was 2.30 and the average family size was 2.94.

In the city, the population was spread out, with 26.3% under the age of 18, 8.4% from 18 to 24, 24.3% from 25 to 44, 20.7% from 45 to 64, and 20.3% who were 65 years of age or older. The median age was 38 years. For every 100 females, there were 82.1 males. For every 100 females age 18 and over, there were 78.1 males.

The median income for a household in the city was $27,530, and the median income for a family was $38,136. Males had a median income of $30,541 versus $17,069 for females. The per capita income for the city was $14,937. About 12.2% of families and 16.2% of the population were below the poverty line, including 23.1% of those under age 18 and 8.3% of those age 65 or over.

Education
The community is served by Columbus USD 493 public school district.

Notable people

 Marcellus Boss, 5th Civilian Governor of Guam
 Elizabeth W. Crandall, educator
 James Reed Hallowell, politician
 Robert A. Long, lumber baron, developer, investor, newspaper owner, and philanthropist
 Doro Merande, film, stage and television actress
 Merle Evans, bandleader for Ringling Brothers, Barnum & Bailey Circus
 Kenneth A. Spencer, industrialist
 Norma Terris, singer and actress
 Leland Justin Webb, 1st Mayor of Columbus, lawyer, served in American Civil War and 19th Kansas Cavalry Regiment
 Thomas Daniel Winter, U.S. Representative from Kansas, 1939–1947.

References

Further reading

 The Columbus Story. Columbus, KS: Columbus Centennial, 1968; Marjorie Forbes; 1968.

External links

 City of Columbus
 Columbus - Directory of Public Officials
 Historic Images of Columbus, Special Photo Collections at Wichita State University Library
 Columbus city map, KDOT

Cities in Kansas
County seats in Kansas
Cities in Cherokee County, Kansas
1868 establishments in Kansas
Populated places established in 1868